Poly Technologies, sometimes abbreviated as PolyTech, a subsidiary of China Poly Group Corporation, is a trade company with headquarters in Beijing, China. The company deals with missiles and other military products. The company was founded by the Chinese People's Liberation Army in order to provide competition to China North Industries Corporation (Norinco). The company is one of China's largest arms exporters and has been sanctioned by the United States.

As a traditional pillar industry of Poly Group Corp., international trading business is mainly undertaken by Poly Technologies Inc., both the predecessor of the Poly Group and a backbone enterprise of the Group. Founded in 1984, it is mainly engaged in the import and export business of general merchandise, special equipment, and technology. Poly Group has established business relations with hundreds of enterprises and governmental organizations of nearly 100 countries and regions, including many multinational corporations such as Boeing of the United States, Bombardier Inc. of Canada, Chevron - Texaco of the United States, Benz of Germany, Ferrari of Italy, State Corporation 'Rosoboronexport' and Japanese Sagawa Logistic Co., Ltd. It has also established cooperative relations with domestic government departments and many noted companies.

Military activity 
Poly Technologies was involved in the shipment of weapons (specifically SALW – Small Arms and Light Weapons) to Zimbabwe around the time of the 2008 Election Crisis, and was then refused entry into South African Ports shortly before docking.

Poly Technologies developed the LANU-M1 vehicle-mounted counter-unmanned aerial vehicle system, designed to be mounted on the roofs of vehicles.

In February 2023, the Center for Advanced Defense Studies reported that customs data showed that Poly Technologies shipped navigation equipment to Rosoboronexport for Mil Mi-17 helicopters following the 2022 Russian invasion of Ukraine.

Products 
Polytech is notable in North America as an early supplier of semi-automatic AK-47-style weapons to civilians. These modifications of Type 56 assault rifle were available in both 5.56 NATO and 7.62 Soviet ammunition, and have been described as "well-made" by Ian McCollum of Forgotten Weapons. Other mainly civilian offerings include versions of the Zijiang M99 as well as M14 (M305) and M16 (CQ-A) clones similar to Norinco's. These three are seen in the Canadian list of prohibited firearms.

Subsidiaries
 Continental Mariner 
 Lolliman, LTD.
 Ringo Trading Company

References

External links

Defence companies of the People's Republic of China
Manufacturing companies based in Beijing
Manufacturing companies established in 1984
Chinese companies established in 1984
China Poly Group